Tony Grimes (born April 8, 2002) is an American football cornerback for Texas A&M University. He had played for three seasons at the University of North Carolina at Chapel Hill before transferring to Texas A&M after the 2022 season.

High school career
Grimes attended Princess Anne High School in Virginia Beach, Virginia. He was selected to the Under Armour All-America Game. A five-star recruit, he committed to North Carolina to play college football, and reclassified from the class of 2021 to 2000.

College career
As a true freshman at North Carolina in 2020, Grimes started four of 12 games, recording 14 tackles, one interception and one sack. As a sophomore in 2021, he started all 13 games and had 47 tackles.

After the 2022 season, he entered the NCAA transfer portal and committed to Texas A&M, which had recently lost four cornerbacks to the transfer portal, for the 2023 season.

References

External links
North Carolina Tar Heels bio

Living people
Players of American football from Virginia
American football cornerbacks
North Carolina Tar Heels football players
2002 births
Texas A&M Aggies football players